D. roseum may refer to:
 Dendrochilum roseum, a synonym for Dendrobium crepidatum, an orchid species
 Dipodium roseum, an orchid species

See also
 Roseum (disambiguation)